Anacrostichus is a subgenus of dance fly, in the fly family Empididae.

Species
Empis bistortae Meigen, 1822
Empis lucida Zetterstedt, 1838
Empis monticola Loew, 1868
Empis nitida Meigen, 1804
Empis verralli Collin, 1927

See also
 List of Empis species

References

Empididae
Articles containing video clips
Insect subgenera
Taxa named by Mario Bezzi